Admiral Fraser may refer to:

Alexander Fraser (Royal Navy officer) (1747–1829), British Royal Navy vice admiral
Bruce Fraser, 1st Baron Fraser of North Cape (1888–1981), British Royal Navy admiral
Thomas Fraser (Royal Navy officer) (1796–1870), British Royal Navy vice admiral
Tim Fraser (fl. 1980s–2020s), British Royal Navy admiral